NVN most often refers to North Vietnam.

NVN may also refer to:

 N. V. N. Somu (1937–1997), Indian politician
 Nahverkehrs-Zweckverband Niederrhein, a subsidiary of Verkehrsverbund Rhein-Ruhr
 National Videotex Network, a defunct online service provider
 Nervino Airport (IATA: NVN), Beckwourth, California
 Newhaven Town railway station, a railway station in Sussex, England
 Nundinae, in Latin inscriptions
 Nventa Biopharmaceuticals Corporation (TSX: NVN)